Colchester High School is a coeducational independent school located in Colchester in Essex, England. The school is owned and operated by the Cognita Group. Colchester High is the only coeducational independent school in Colchester to offer secondary education.

History 
The school was a girls' school when it opened in 1882. It took boys from 1910, becoming an all-boys establishment over the course of the next 20 years. In 1993 the school started admitting girls again. The school is still affectionately known by many of the Old pupils from before it became co-educational as the "Boys'" or "Boys' High".

The first Principal, Mr. Grӧne, stoutly refusing all approaches by the County Education Committee to incorporate the School into its education remit. It has pursued its independent course ever since, despite a spell as a hospital annexe from 1917 to 1918 and being strafed in 1941. For many years the school was family owned. In 2005, it was bought by Cognita, the largest independent schools business in the UK.

The school today 
The school admits pupils aged 2 1/2 to 16 from a wide catchment area including Colchester, Braintree, Marks Tey, Coggeshall, Kelvedon, Tiptree, Maldon, and Wivenhoe. Entry is normally at ages 2 1/2–15. Children are able to join at other ages if there is a vacancy. Younger children spend an informal morning at the school whilst entry to the Senior School from the Juniors is via an Entrance assessment, often held in March. Admission is on the basis of interview and/or assessment, but pupils will not be disadvantaged by the school by virtue of gender, race, background or religion. The 2008 GCSE results for the school were at a high standard, making Colchester High one of the top ranking schools in Essex.

Class sizes are typically with approx. 16–18 in a class, although this has grown recently.

The school has an 'Old Boys and Girls Association' which all Old Colcestrians are eligible to join once they have left the school, often after their exam year. Membership of the OBGA allows the members to wear the association tie and attend the "social events" of the year.

The school has four houses: Normans (Royal Blue); Saxons (Old Gold); Romans (Red); and Danes (Forest Green). Each house has two senior pupils who act as a Captain of the House and a Sports Captain. The school has traditionally tried to place pupils in the same house as any relatives who have attended the school before them.

The school plays several sports during school 'Games', they are mainly: Rugby; Football; Cross Country; Hockey; Athletics; and Cricket. During each Year's PE lessons the main sports are Badminton; Indoor Cricket; Darts; Circuit Training; Volleyball and Basketball.

Over recent years, there have been two new deputy heads after Mr Robertson (former head of the seniors) left. First being Mr Croydon, and second being Mrs Goodwin.

References

External links 
 Colchester High School website
 Profile on the ISC website

Educational institutions established in 1882
Private schools in Essex
Cognita
Member schools of the Independent Schools Association (UK)
1882 establishments in England
Schools in Colchester (town)